Live from New York is a live album by Jesus Culture with Martin Smith. The album was released on November 20, 2012 by Columbia Records and Integrity Media, and produced by Jeremy Edwardson.

Background
Jesus Culture was joined by former Delirious? lead vocalist Martin Smith, and recorded the album live at Jesus Culture Conference in June 2012.

Critical reception

Live from New York has garnered "universal acclaim" by the nine review of the album.

AllMusic's David Jeffries called the album a "unique effort". At CCM Magazine, Grace S. Aspinwall proclaimed that "the result is spectacular" with respect to the teaming up of Jesus Culture and Martin Smith on the album, and wrote that "Smith bolsters an already stellar team to greatness." The Christian Manifesto's Calvin E'Jon Moore told that the release has "very few flaws." Joshua Andre of Christian Music Zine evoked how "the 110 minute journey is truly magical and God-breathed!" In addition, Andre found that "Martin is such a great songwriter and brings a certain type of energy to these ballads and upbeat tracks too", which the whole effort was "Well done everyone involved." Cross Rhythms Tony Cummings signaled that "occasionally, recording a live worship album completely blurs the distinction between deft musical expertise and audience participation atmosphere, between Holy Spirit-blown improvisation and thoughtful theological songwriting, between popular art and timeless anointing. This is one of those occasions."

Jonathan Andre of Indie Vision Music surmised that "Martin is still giving us anthems and melodies that are certain to be classics for years to come", which he vowed that the album is "a worshipful experience like no other", and stated that "Live From New York gives a great worshipful experience to any listener". Louder Than the Music's Dave Wood affirmed that "Worship music has never sounded better", and he found that with respect to "the guitar playing on this album is nothing short of world class, with remarkable riffs that float and soar in the background, while passion soaked vocals from Martin and the Jesus Culture team articulate their worship." Furthermore, Wood called this a "simply stunning" album. Mary Burklin of New Release Tuesday said this "is an experience, an album inviting the listener into the room with the band and the audience as they have a corporate conversation with God". and she goes onto proclaim that "the experience is well-crafted through a masterful mix of crowd vocals, the gifted worship leaders, and moments of reflection."

However, Burklin was critical in noting that "although it does not bring much fresh material to the table musically, this is an album worth listening to for those seeking passionate pursuit of God and a deeper connection to His people in the community that is the Church." At Worship Leader, Jeremy Armstrong highlighted that the album "is unique in the Jesus Culture oeuvre because Martin Smith is so present—in a good way", and said the band "once again captured the voice of a generation engaging with God in their native tongue where passion, power, intensity and intimacy converge in a musical rhapsodic prayer."

Commercial performance
Upon its debut, the album was charted as selling the seventh most amongst Christian albums by Billboard, and the No. 123 most sold albums in the United States.

Track listing

Charts

References 

2012 live albums
Jesus Culture albums
Live contemporary Christian music albums